The Union of Burma was the official name of Myanmar (Burma) during various periods of its modern history. It may refer to the:
 Union of Burma (1948–1962), the Burmese state under the AFPFL-led civilian government
 Union of Burma (1962–1974), later known as the Socialist Republic of the Union of Burma (1974–1988), the Burmese state under the military dictatorship of Ne Win
 Union of Burma (1988–1989), later known as the Union of Myanmar (1989–2011), the Burmese state under the SPDC / SLORC military junta
 National Coalition Government of the Union of Burma (1990–2012), which claimed to be the government-in-exile of Myanmar (Burma)

See also 
 Names of Myanmar